HD 217107 (6 G. Piscium) is a yellow subgiant star approximately 65 light-years away from Earth in the constellation of Pisces (the Fish).  Its mass is very similar to the Sun's, although it is considerably older.  Two planets have been discovered orbiting the star: one is extremely close and completes an orbit every seven days, while the other is much more distant, taking fourteen years to complete an orbit.

Distance, age, and mass
HD 217107 is fairly close to the Sun: the Gaia astrometric satellite measured its parallax as 49.8170 Milliarcseconds, which corresponds to a distance of 65.47 light years. Its apparent magnitude is 6.17, making it just barely visible to the naked eye under favourable conditions.

Spectroscopic observations show that its spectral type is G7 or G8, which means its temperature is about 5,000 K.  Its mass is thought to be roughly the same as the Sun's, although its estimated age of 7.7 billion years is rather older than the Sun's 4.6 billion years, and it is thought to be beginning to evolve away from the main sequence, having consumed almost all the hydrogen in its core in nuclear fusion reactions.

Planetary system
A study of the radial velocity of HD 217107 carried out in 1998 revealed that its motion along the line of sight varied over a 7.1-day cycle.  The period and amplitude of this variation indicated that it was caused by a planetary companion in orbit around the star, with a minimum mass slightly greater than that of Jupiter. The companion planet was designated HD 217107 b.

While most planets with orbital periods of less than 10 days have almost circular orbits, HD 217107 b has a somewhat eccentric orbit, and its discoverers hypothesized that this could be due to the gravitational influence of a second planet in the system at a distance of several astronomical units (AU).  Confirmation of the existence of a second planet followed in 2005, when long term observations of the star's radial velocity variations revealed a variation on a period of about eight years, caused by a planet with a mass at least twice that of Jupiter in a very eccentric orbit with a semimajor axis of about 4.3 AU. The second planet was designated HD 217107 c.

References

External links
 Extrasolar Planet Interactions by Rory Barnes & Richard Greenberg, Lunar and Planetary Lab, University of Arizona
 
 

G-type subgiants
217107
113421
Pisces (constellation)
Planetary systems with two confirmed planets
Durchmusterung objects
Piscium, 6
8734